Egernia douglasi, also known commonly as the Kimberley crevice-skink, is a species of lizard in the family Scincidae. The species is endemic to Australia.

Etymology
The specific name, douglasi, is in honor of Australian zoologist Athol M. Douglas.

Geographic range
E. douglasi is found in the Australian state of Western Australia. It is present in the Charnley River–Artesian Range Wildlife Sanctuary in the Kimberley region of WA.

Habitat
The preferred natural habitat of E. douglasi is rocky areas in savanna.

Reproduction
E. douglasi is ovoviviparous.

References

Further reading
Cogger HG (2014). Reptiles and Amphibians of Australia, Seventh Edition. Clayton, Victoria, Australia: CSIRO Publishing. xxx + 1,033 pp. .
Glauert L (1956). "A New Skink from West Kimberley, Egernia striolata douglasi ssp. nov." Western Australian Naturalist 5: 117–119. (Egernia striolata douglasi, new subspecies).
Storr GM (1978). "The genus Egernia (Reptilia, Lacertilia) in Western Australia". Records of the Western Australian Museum 6 (2): 147–187. (Egernia douglasi, new taxonomic status, p. 171).
Wilson S, Swan G (2013). A Complete Guide to Reptiles of Australia, Fourth Edition. Sydney: New Holland Publishers. 522 pp. .

Skinks of Australia
Egernia
Endemic fauna of Australia
Taxa named by Ludwig Glauert
Reptiles described in 1956